Earth Moving is the 12th record album by British musician Mike Oldfield, released in  1989. Unlike Oldfield's albums released prior to Earth Moving, the album contains no instrumental tracks.

Album analysis
Oldfield used several vocalists on the album, including his then girlfriend, Anita Hegerland. The album's music was performed mainly with synthesizers. It was the first time Oldfield recorded an album without an instrumental piece; each track being vocal-based pop and rock songs. Oldfield's only other album free of instrumentals to date is 2014's Man on the Rocks.

The final track, despite appearing to be a lengthier piece, consists of two short, apparently unconnected songs, combined into one track, with a noticeable pause in between. According to Oldfield, the album was made in full compliance with his recording company, Virgin Records, which demanded he create more commercially oriented material than his previous albums. After recording Earth Moving Oldfield wanted to move away from 'computerised music' and return to real musicians and instruments; this is evident in his next album, Amarok.

Promotion
According to an interview Mike Oldfield and Anita Hegerland gave on the television programme Good Morning Britain, the song "Innocent" was inspired by their young daughter Greta, who appears in the song's music video. In the programme, Oldfield and Hegerland performed an acoustic version of the song, Hegerland singing and Oldfield playing the guitar.

"Earth Moving", "Innocent" and "(One Glance Is) Holy" were released as singles.

Equipment
Earth Moving is the first album on which Oldfield used PRS guitars, having previously used Gibson guitars. Synthesizers on the album include a Fairlight Series III and various instruments made by Roland and Korg (including an M1). The album was recorded using an Atari 1040ST with C-Lab Notator software, a Harrison Series X console, a Studer A8800 tape deck with Dolby SR noise reduction, an Ampex Grand Master tape and ATC SCM200 monitors.

Track listing
All tracks written by Mike Oldfield.

Side one
 "Holy" – 4:37
 "Hostage" – 4:09
 "Far Country" – 4:25
 "Innocent" – 3:30
 "Runaway Son" – 4:05

Side two
 "See the Light" – 3:59
 "Earth Moving" – 4:03
 "Blue Night" – 3:47
 "Nothing But" / "Bridge to Paradise" – 8:40

Personnel
 Mike Oldfield – guitars and keyboards
 Max Bacon – vocals ("Hostage", "Bridge to Paradise")
 Adrian Belew – vocals ("Holy"), left channel guitar solo ("Far Country")
 Nikki "B" Bentley – vocals ("Earth Moving")
 Anita Hegerland – vocals ("Innocent")
 Carol Kenyon – vocals ("Nothing But")
 Raphael Ravenscroft – saxophone
 Maggie Reilly – vocals ("Blue Night")
 Phil Spalding – bass guitar, backing vocals ("Bridge to Paradise", "See the Light", "Holy") 
 Chris Thompson – vocals ("Runaway Son", "See the Light")
 Carl Wayne – backing vocals ("Earth Moving")
 Mark Williamson – vocals ("Far Country")

Charts

Weekly charts

Year-end charts

Certifications

References

External links
 Mike Oldfield Discography - Earth Moving at Tubular.net
 Earth Moving lyrics at Tubular.net

Mike Oldfield albums
1989 albums
Virgin Records albums